George Michael Marovich (born January 2, 1931) is an inactive Senior United States district judge of the United States District Court for the Northern District of Illinois.

Education and career

Born in East Hazel Crest, Illinois, Marovich received a Bachelor of Science degree from the University of Illinois at Urbana–Champaign in 1952 and a Juris Doctor from the University of Illinois College of Law in 1954. He was a title examiner for the Chicago Title and Trust Company in Chicago, Illinois from 1954 to 1959. He was in private practice in South Holland, Illinois from 1959 to 1966. He was a vice president & trust officer for South Holland Trust & Savings Bank of South Holland from 1966 to 1976. He was a judge of the Criminal Division of the Circuit Court of Cook County, Illinois from 1976 to 1985. He was a judge of the Chancery Division of the Circuit Court of Cook County, Illinois from 1985 to 1988.

Federal judicial service

Marovich was nominated by President Ronald Reagan on February 2, 1988, to a seat on the United States District Court for the Northern District of Illinois vacated by Judge Susan Christine O'Meara Getzendanner. He was confirmed by the United States Senate on March 31, 1988, and received his commission on April 1, 1988. He assumed senior status on January 2, 2000. He is currently in inactive senior status, which means that he no longer hears cases or participates in the business of the court.

References

Sources
 

1931 births
Living people
American people of Serbian descent
Illinois state court judges
Judges of the United States District Court for the Northern District of Illinois
United States district court judges appointed by Ronald Reagan
20th-century American judges
University of Illinois Urbana-Champaign alumni
People from Cook County, Illinois
21st-century American judges